Yevgeniy Vasilievich Rudakov (2 January 1942 – 21 December 2011) was a Ukrainian footballer of Russian origin who played as a goalkeeper. In 1971, he was recognized as the Best Ukrainian Player of the Year becoming the first foreigner to be awarded such honors.

A six-time domestic champion of the Soviet Union with Dynamo Kyiv, Rudakov also helped Dynamo win the Soviet Cup twice, the Cup Winners' Cup and the UEFA Super Cup. He also represented the USSR national football team and helped them reach the finals of Euro 1972 finals. After the UEFA Euro 1972 along with his teammates by Soviet Union national football team – Revaz Dzodzuashvili and Murtaz Khurtsilava – he was included in the team of the tournament, along with such great players as Franz Beckenbauer, Gerd Müller, Paul Breitner, Uli Hoeness and Günter Netzer. In 1971 Rudakov was also chosen the Soviet Footballer of the Year and the best goalkeeper of the USSR in 1969, 1971, and 1972.

At the Olympic Games 1972 he earned four wins and two shutouts. He also won 21 games with the regular senior squad and finished 22 games without allowing any goals. His career goals against average was at 0.69.

After finishing his playing career, he coached few Ukraine-based clubs, but mostly stayed on at Dynamo Kyiv's sport school as a children coach.

He was nominated twice for the Ballon d'Or, in 1971 when he came 12th, and 1972 when he came 18th.

Honours
Dynamo Kyiv
Soviet Top League: 1966, 1967, 1968, 1971, 1974, 1975, 1977
Soviet Cup: 1964, 1966, 1974
UEFA Cup Winners' Cup: 1974–75
UEFA Super Cup: 1975

Soviet Union
Olympic Games bronze medal: 1972
UEFA European Championship runner-up: 1972

Individual
UEFA European Championship Team of the Tournament: 1972
Ukrainian Footballer of the Year: 1971
Soviet Footballer of the Year: 1971

References

External links
 RussiaTeam biography
 

1942 births
2011 deaths
Footballers from Moscow
Association football goalkeepers
Russian footballers
Russian emigrants to Ukraine
Ukrainian people of Russian descent
Ukrainian footballers
Soviet footballers
Soviet Union international footballers
UEFA Euro 1968 players
UEFA Euro 1972 players
Olympic footballers of the Soviet Union
Footballers at the 1972 Summer Olympics
Olympic bronze medalists for the Soviet Union
Soviet Top League players
FC Torpedo Moscow players
FC Dynamo Kyiv players
FC Spartak Ivano-Frankivsk managers
FC Kremin Kremenchuk managers
Soviet football managers
Ukrainian Premier League managers
Olympic medalists in football
Medalists at the 1972 Summer Olympics
Burials at Baikove Cemetery